Dartnell is an Irish surname. Notable people with the surname include:

John Dartnell (1838–1913), Commandant of the Natal Mounted Police
Jorge Chavez Dartnell (1887–1910), Peruvian aviator
Julie Dartnell, Academy Award winning makeup artist
Lewis Dartnell, British author, presenter and professor of astrobiology
Pedro Dartnell (1873–1944), Chilean military officer and member of the Government Junta of Chile in 1925
Stephen Dartnell, British actor who appeared in several television programmes
Wilbur Dartnell VC (1885–1915), Australian recipient of the Victoria Cross

See also
Darnell